Matthew Shenoda is an Egyptian-American poet, writer, and professor based in the United States. Born July 14, 1977 in California to Coptic parents who immigrated from Egypt, Matthew Shenoda is a writer and educator whose poems and writings have appeared in a variety of newspapers, journals, radio programs and anthologies. He has been twice nominated for a Pushcart Prize and his work has been supported by the California Arts Council and the Lannan Foundation among others.

His debut collection of poems, Somewhere Else (Coffee House Press), was named one of 2005's debut books of the year by Poets & Writers Magazine and was winner of a 2006 American Book Award. He is also the author of Seasons of Lotus, Seasons of Bone (BOA Editions Ltd.),and author of Tahrir Suite: Poems (TriQuarterly Books/Northwestern University Press), winner of the Arab American Book Award. With Kwame Dawes he is editor of Bearden's Odyssey: Poets Respond to the Art of Romare Bearden (TriQuarterly Books/Northwestern University Press). His most recent collection of poems, The Way Of The Earth is forthcoming in 2022 from TriQuarterly Books/Northwestern University Press.

Shenoda lectures widely and has taught extensively in the fields of ethnic studies and creative writing. He began his teaching career in the College of Ethnic Studies at San Francisco State University. The former Assistant Provost for Equity & Diversity and faculty in the School of Critical Studies at California Institute of the Arts, Shenoda also served as Associate Dean of the School of Fine and Performing Arts at Columbia College Chicago and Dean of Academic Diversity, Equity, and Inclusion and Professor of English and Creative Writing at Columbia College Chicago, as well as Vice President and Associate Provost for Social Equity and Inclusion and Professor of Literary Arts and Studies at Rhode Island School of Design. Currently he is Professor and Chair of the Department of Literary Arts at Brown University. Additionally, Shenoda has served on the Board of Directors of several arts and education organizations and is a founding editor of the African Poetry Book Fund.

Awards
 2015 Arab American Book Award
 2006 American Book Award
 California Arts Council Fellowship
 Lannan Foundation Residency 
 Hala Maksoud Award for Emerging Voice

Books
 The Way Of The Earth. Northwestern University Press, 2022.  
 Bearden's Odyssey: Poets Respond to the Art of Romare Bearden edited by  Kwame Dawes and Matthew Shenoda,  Northwestern University Press, 2017.  
 Tahrir Suite. Northwestern University Press, 2014.

Anthologies

References

External links
"Author's website"
"For Charles Mingus & That Ever-Living “Love Chant”", Fishouse

American male poets
California Institute of the Arts faculty
Living people
Year of birth missing (living people)
American people of Coptic descent
American Book Award winners
Christian poets